Sanyang may refer to
 Sanyang Industry Co Ltd., a scooter company
 Sanyang (surname)
 Sanyang Station on the Gyeongbuk Line in South Korea
 Sanyang Plaza Station of the Wuxi Metro in China
 Sanyang Road Station of the Wuhan Metro in China
 Sanyang, a village in the Kombo South district in The Gambia
 Sanyang, a town in Jingshan County, Jingmen, Hubei
 The Hunt (Sanyang), a 2016 film